Joel Alexander Kim Booster (born Kim Joonmin; February 29, 1988) is a South Korean-born American actor, comedian, producer, and writer. He co-produced and wrote for Big Mouth and The Other Two and as an actor has appeared on Shrill, Search Party, and Sunnyside. In 2022, he wrote, produced, and starred in the Hulu romantic comedy Fire Island, a modern adaptation of Pride and Prejudice with a main cast of Asian American actors.

Early life and education
Born Kim Joonmin in Jeju Island, South Korea, Booster was adopted by an American couple as an infant. He was raised in Plainfield, Illinois, in a "conservative, white, Evangelical Christian family" and was initially homeschooled. He went to public school for the first time when he was 16, which he described as his "first time being around non-religious people." He knew he was gay from childhood but kept it a secret. His senior year in high school, his parents found out he was gay by reading his diary where he had described his sexual encounters with other boys. Booster moved out and began to couchsurf until he stayed with a family friend.

He studied theater at Millikin University for his bachelor's degree.

Career
Living in Chicago, Booster took a job as a copywriter and began to perform in theater and write jokes after work. His stand-up career began in an unconventional fashion by opening up for plays in Chicago's theater scene. He moved to New York in 2014 to pursue a career in comedy. He performed a set on Conan in 2016. He then appeared in his own Comedy Central Stand-Up Presents special in 2017. Booster has also written for the shows Billy on the Street, Big Mouth, and The Other Two.

On November 3, 2018, he released his debut stand-up album, Model Minority. The material covers racism in the gay community, growing up Asian in a white community, and his own non-adherence to stereotypes about Asian Americans.

Booster has acted in various roles such as with Susan Sarandon in the YouTube original film Viper Club; on Netflix's The Week Of and on Hulu's Shrill starring Aidy Bryant. He co-starred as Jun Ho in the NBC comedy series Sunnyside, which ran for one season. In 2019, he co-hosted a digital series called Unsend with Patti Harrison on Comedy Central. He is a regular panelist on Wait Wait... Don't Tell Me! on NPR. In 2019, he started the podcast Urgent Care with Joel Kim Booster + Mitra Jouhari with comedian Mitra Jouhari under Earwolf.
Booster appeared on the December 8, 2020 episode of The George Lucas Talk Show with fellow guest Eliza Skinner.

Booster wrote and starred in the 2022 romantic comedy film Fire Island, streaming on Hulu and inspired by Pride and Prejudice. It is one of few mainstream gay films with a predominantly Asian American cast, and co-stars Margaret Cho, Bowen Yang, and Conrad Ricamora. The film received positive reception and was noted for its cinematography, faithfulness to Pride and Prejudice, and depiction of a loving friendship between Howie and Noah (played by Yang and Booster).

In 2022, he released a stand-up special on Netflix called Joel Kim Booster: Psychosexual. Abbey White of The Hollywood Reporter described the special positively: "...Psychosexual offers a hilariously biting deconstruction and reconstruction of Booster’s identity onstage; a repudiation not only of himself as a representative or “role model” for his various communities, but an affirmation that as a comedian, his only job is to tell jokes — regardless of whether that speaks to any community at all."

In September 2022, he performed at Life is Beautiful in Las Vegas alongside EDM artist and actress Freya Fox, and comedians Atsuko Okatsuka and Andrew Lopez.

Personal life 
Booster is gay and often talks about his sexuality in his stand-up. He has stated that he knew he was gay before he knew he was Asian. On July 21, 2020, Booster publicly shared that he has bipolar disorder.

Accolades 
Booster was called a Comic to Watch by Variety and one of Vultures 20 Comedians You Should and Will Know, and was named a Forbes' 30 Under 30 in Hollywood & Entertainment.

Discography 

 2018: Model Minority

Filmography

Television

Film

Awards and nominations

See also 
 Koreans in New York City
 LGBT culture in New York City
 List of LGBT people from New York City

References

External links 

 Official Instagram

1988 births
Living people
21st-century American comedians
21st-century American male actors
21st-century American screenwriters
American adoptees
American gay actors
American gay writers
American male actors of Korean descent
American male comedians
American male film actors
American male television actors
Comedians from Illinois
Gay comedians
American LGBT people of Asian descent
LGBT people from Illinois
Millikin University alumni
People from Jeju Province
People from Plainfield, Illinois
People with bipolar disorder
South Korean emigrants to the United States
American stand-up comedians
Entertainers from Illinois
American LGBT comedians